Tadhg Ó Cuinn, Irish scribe and author, fl. October 1415.

Bio

Little is known of Ó Cuinn, who is chiefly known from a Materia medica he compiled in October 1415, his "principal source, and the work whose format he followed, was the Liber de simplici medicina, usually known, from the opening words of the introduction, as Circa Instans. Joannes Platearius is named as the author of Circa Instans in the early printed versions of the text."  His other sources were

De Viribus Herbarum by Macer Floridus
Liber dietarum particularium by Ysaac Israeli/Isaac Iudaeus)
Book Two of the Liber aggregatus de medicinis singularibus of Avicenna's Canon de medicina.
Book of Simple Medicines by Ibn Sarabi, otherwise Serapion the Younger.
"Local sources. There is a number of items in the text for which no Latin sources have been found, and it is suggested in Chapter 4 that some of these may represent a purely Irish tradition."

Overview of Ó Cuinn's Materia medica

This Materia Medica is of a high standard. At a rough check, it appears that, of the 208 plant simples and 29 plant products discussed, some two thirds are mentioned in the 12th edition of the Pharmacognosy of Trease and Evans as being relevant still or until recently, and another 15 were and are of nutritional value. That the author discusses only those drugs which he knew to be in use, is indicated by the drugs which are discussed in the Erlangen copy of Circa Instans, but which are not referred to in the Irish version. Of the 38 such drugs, 33 are foreign and obviously hard to come by, and only five are plants that occur in the Irish flora. The author was practical, too, in selecting information from his sources, He seems to give only those uses of the drug which he knew to be made in practice in this country. To mention an obvious case, he omits the numerous references to scorpion stings which occur in the Latin texts. On the other hand, he frequently mentions the mad dog when the Latin source does not.
The text appears to be no slavish rendering of the voice of ancient authority, but a sensible selection of information believed to be of practical use. It indicates the ailments that were known in the country at the time, and the drugs that were used in treating them.

The colophon at the end of the text reads:

So we have achieved a succinct and beneficial fulfilment of this book, drawn from the Antidotaries and Herbals of the city of Salerno, according to the united studium of the doctors of Montpellier. Those masters have stated that everything that is begun in the name of God deserves to be completed in the name of God.And that is how this book was completed by Tadhg Ó Chuinn, bachelor in physic, in the month of October, on the feast-day of Saint Luke, the Apostle, and in the year of Our Lord one thousand, four hundred and fifteen, to be precise. The End, Amen. This book was written out by Aedh Buidhe Ó Leighin ...

Manuscripts

Extant copies of the text were made by Aodh Buidhe Ó Leighin, Donnchadh Ó Bolgaidi, Gilla Padraic Ó Callanain, Gilla Coluim, Aonghus mac Fearchair mic Aonghuis, Maghnus mac Gilla na naemh micc a Leagha, Pádruic gruamdha O Siaghuil, Domhnall Ó Coinmhidhe, Muiris Ó Gormáin, Micheál Óg Ó Longáin, Micheál Ó Longáin, Joseph Ó Longáin.

Edition

Prior to his death in July 1993, aged sixty-seven, Micheál Ó Conchubhair spent his final five years making an edition of the text. "At the time of his death, Micheál had nearly but not quite completed his translation and referencing of the Materia Medica, calling his own manuscript an "interim edition". His family was keen that his scholarship should not go to waste but would be available to assist others interested in further researching this important field." In 2018, it was made available online at the Corpus of Electronic Texts, and due to be launched at the Irish Conference of Medievalists in Cork, 27–29 June 2019.

References

External links
 https://celt.ucc.ie//published/G600005/index.html
 http://www.irishmedievalists.com/

Irish-language writers
Irish scribes
15th-century Irish writers